Mincho Minchev (born 31 October 1967) is a retired Bulgarian football forward.

Club career
Mincho Minchev played with FC Dimitrovgrad in their season in A PFG after they reached promotion in 1986. Later he played with F.C. Etar and PFC Lokomotiv Plovdiv in Bulgarian top-tier, before he moved abroad, during the winter-break of the 1990–91 season, when he joined Serbian club FK Radnički Beograd playing with them in the second half of the 1990–91 Yugoslav Second League. He played with Radnički Belgrade also the first half of the 1991–92 Yugoslav Second League, but during the winter-break he returned to Bulgaria and joined top-league side PFC Botev Plovdiv. He later played with FC Spartak Plovdiv in 1995–96 A Group.

Mincho Minchev was part of the Bulgarian U-20 squad at the 1987 FIFA World Youth Championship.

References

1967 births
Living people
Bulgarian footballers
Association football forwards
FC Dimitrovgrad players
FC Etar Veliko Tarnovo players
PFC Lokomotiv Plovdiv players
Botev Plovdiv players
FC Spartak Plovdiv players
First Professional Football League (Bulgaria) players
FK Radnički Beograd players
Expatriate footballers in Yugoslavia
Expatriate footballers in Serbia and Montenegro